The Protocols of the Elders of Zion or The Protocols of the Meetings of the Learned Elders of Zion is a fabricated antisemitic text purporting to describe a Jewish plan for global domination. The hoax was plagiarized from several earlier sources, some not antisemitic in nature. It was first published in Russia in 1903, translated into multiple languages, and disseminated internationally in the early part of the 20th century. It played a key part in popularizing belief in an international Jewish conspiracy.

Distillations of the work were assigned by some German teachers, as if factual, to be read by German schoolchildren after the Nazis came to power in 1933, despite having been exposed as fraudulent by the British newspaper The Times in 1921 and the German Frankfurter Zeitung in 1924. It remains widely available in numerous languages, in print and on the Internet, and continues to be presented by neofascist, fundamentalist and antisemitic groups as a genuine document. It has been described as "probably the most influential work of antisemitism ever written".

Creation

The Protocols is a fabricated document purporting to be factual. Textual evidence shows that it could not have been produced prior to 1901. It is known that the title of Sergei Nilus' widely distributed edition contains the dates "1902–1903", and it is likely that the document was actually written at this time in Russia, despite Nilus' attempt to cover this up by inserting French-sounding words into his edition. Cesare G. De Michelis argues that it was manufactured in the months after a Russian Zionist congress in September 1902, and that it was originally a parody of Jewish idealism meant for internal circulation among antisemites until it was decided to clean it up and publish it as if it were real. Self-contradictions in various testimonies show that the individuals involved—including the text's initial publisher, Pavel Krushevan—deliberately obscured the origins of the text and lied about it in the decades afterwards.

If the placement of the forgery in 1902–1903 Russia is correct, then it was written at the beginning of a series of anti-Jewish pogroms in the Russian Empire, in which thousands of Jews were killed or fled the country. Many of the people whom De Michelis suspects of involvement in the forgery were directly responsible for inciting the pogroms.

Political conspiracy background
Towards the end of the 18th century, following the Partitions of Poland, the Russian Empire inherited the world's largest Jewish population. The Jews lived in shtetls in the West of the Empire, in the Pale of Settlement and until the 1840s, local Jewish affairs were organised through the qahal, the semi-autonomous Jewish government, including for purposes of taxation and conscription into the Imperial Russian Army. Following the ascent of liberalism in Europe, the Russian ruling class became more hardline in its reactionary policies, upholding the banner of Orthodoxy, Autocracy, and Nationality, whereby non-Orthodox and non-Russian subjects, including Jews, were not always embraced. Jews who attempted to assimilate were regarded with suspicion as potential "infiltrators" supposedly trying to "take over society", while Jews who remained attached to traditional Jewish culture were resented as undesirable aliens.

Resentment towards Jews, for the aforementioned reasons, existed in Russian society, but the idea of a Protocols-esque international Jewish conspiracy for world domination was minted in the 1860s. Jacob Brafman, a Russian Jew from Minsk, had a falling out with agents of the local qahal and consequently turned against Judaism. He subsequently converted to the Russian Orthodox Church and authored polemics against the Talmud and the qahal. Brafman claimed in his books The Local and Universal Jewish Brotherhoods (1868) and The Book of the Kahal (1869), published in Vilna, that the qahal continued to exist in secret and that it had as its principal aim undermining Christian entrepreneurs, taking over their property and ultimately seizing power. He also claimed that it was an international conspiratorial network, under the central control of the Alliance Israélite Universelle, which was based in Paris and then under the leadership of Adolphe Crémieux, a prominent freemason. The Vilna Talmudist, Jacob Barit, attempted to refute Brafman's claim.

The impact of Brafman's work took on an international aspect when it was translated into English, French, German and other languages. The image of the "qahal" as a secret international Jewish shadow government working as a state within a state was picked up by anti-Jewish publications in Russia and was taken seriously by some Russian officials such as P. A. Cherevin and Nikolay Pavlovich Ignatyev who in the 1880s urged governors-general of provinces to seek out the supposed qahal. This was around the time of the Narodnaya Volya assassination of Tsar Alexander II of Russia and the subsequent pogroms. In France, it was translated by Monsignor Ernest Jouin in 1925, who supported the Protocols. In 1928, Siegfried Passarge, a geographer who later gave his support to the Nazis, translated it into German.

Aside from Brafman, there were other early writings which posited a similar concept to the Protocols. This includes The Conquest of the World by the Jews (1878), published in Basel and authored by Osman Bey (born Frederick Millingen). Millingen was a British subject and son of English physician Julius Michael Millingen, but served as an officer in the Ottoman Army where he was born. He converted to Islam, but later became a Russian Orthodox Christian. Bey's work was followed up by Hippolytus Lutostansky's The Talmud and the Jews (1879) which claimed that Jews wanted to divide Russia among themselves.

Sources employed
Source material for the forgery consisted jointly of Dialogue aux enfers entre Machiavel et Montesquieu (Dialogue in Hell Between Machiavelli and Montesquieu), an 1864 political satire by Maurice Joly; and a chapter from Biarritz, an 1868 novel by the antisemitic German novelist Hermann Goedsche, which had been translated into Russian in 1872.

Literary forgery
The Protocols is one of the best-known and most-discussed examples of literary forgery, with analysis and proof of its fraudulent origin dating as far back as 1921. The forgery is an early example of "conspiracy theory" literature. Written mainly in the first person plural, the text includes generalizations, truisms, and platitudes on how to take over the world: take control of the media and the financial institutions, change the traditional social order, etc. It does not contain specifics.

Maurice Joly

Numerous parts in the Protocols, in one calculation, some 160 passages, were plagiarized from Joly's political satire Dialogue in Hell Between Machiavelli and Montesquieu. This book was a thinly veiled attack on the political ambitions of Napoleon III, who, represented by the non-Jewish character Machiavelli, plots to rule the world. Joly, a republican who later served in the Paris Commune, was sentenced to 15 months as a direct result of his book's publication. Umberto Eco considered that Dialogue in Hell was itself plagiarised in part from a novel by Eugène Sue, Les Mystères du Peuple (1849–56).

Identifiable phrases from Joly constitute 4% of the first half of the first edition, and 12% of the second half; later editions, including most translations, have longer quotes from Joly.

The Protocols 1–19 closely follow the order of Maurice Joly's Dialogues 1–17. For example:

Philip Graves brought this plagiarism to light in a series of articles in The Times in 1921, being the first to expose the Protocols as a forgery to the public.

Hermann Goedsche

Daniel Keren wrote in his essay "Commentary on The Protocols of the Elders of Zion", "Goedsche was a postal clerk and a spy for the Prussian Secret Police. He had been forced to leave the postal work due to his part in forging evidence in the prosecution against the Democratic leader Benedict Waldeck in 1849." Following his dismissal, Goedsche began a career as a conservative columnist, and wrote literary fiction under the pen name Sir John Retcliffe. His 1868 novel Biarritz (To Sedan) contains a chapter called "The Jewish Cemetery in Prague and the Council of Representatives of the Twelve Tribes of Israel." In it, Goedsche (who was unaware that only two of the original twelve Biblical "tribes" remained) depicts a clandestine nocturnal meeting of members of a mysterious rabbinical cabal that is planning a diabolical "Jewish conspiracy." At midnight, the Devil appears to contribute his opinions and insight. The chapter closely resembles a scene in Alexandre Dumas' Giuseppe Balsamo (1848), in which Joseph Balsamo a.k.a. Alessandro Cagliostro and company plot the Affair of the Diamond Necklace.

In 1872, a Russian translation of "The Jewish Cemetery in Prague" appeared in Saint Petersburg as a separate pamphlet of purported non-fiction. François Bournand, in his Les Juifs et nos Contemporains (1896), reproduced the soliloquy at the end of the chapter, in which the character Levit expresses as factual the wish that Jews be "kings of the world in 100 years" —crediting a "Chief Rabbi John Readcliff." Perpetuation of the myth of the authenticity of Goedsche's story, in particular the "Rabbi's speech", facilitated later accounts of the equally mythical authenticity of the Protocols. Like the Protocols, many asserted that the fictional "rabbi's speech" had a ring of authenticity, regardless of its origin: "This speech was published in our time, eighteen years ago," read an 1898 report in La Croix, "and all the events occurring before our eyes were anticipated in it with truly frightening accuracy."

Fictional events in Joly's Dialogue aux enfers entre Machiavel et Montesquieu, which appeared four years before Biarritz, may well have been the inspiration for Goedsche's fictional midnight meeting, and details of the outcome of the supposed plot. Goedsche's chapter may have been an outright plagiarism of Joly, Dumas père, or both.

Structure and content
The Protocols purports to document the minutes of a late-19th-century meeting attended by world Jewish leaders, the "Elders of Zion", who are conspiring to take over the world. The forgery places in the mouths of the Jewish leaders a variety of plans, most of which derive from older antisemitic canards. For example, the Protocols includes plans to subvert the morals of the non-Jewish world, plans for Jewish bankers to control the world's economies, plans for Jewish control of the press, and – ultimately – plans for the destruction of civilization. The document consists of 24 "protocols", which have been analyzed by Steven Jacobs and Mark Weitzman, who documented several recurrent themes that appear repeatedly in the 24 protocols, as shown in the following table:

Conspiracy references 
According to Daniel Pipes,

Pipes notes that the Protocols emphasizes recurring themes of conspiratorial antisemitism: "Jews always scheme", "Jews are everywhere", "Jews are behind every institution", "Jews obey a central authority, the shadowy 'Elders'", and "Jews are close to success."

As fiction in the genre of literature, the tract was analyzed by Umberto Eco in his novel Foucault's Pendulum (1988):

Eco also dealt with the Protocols in 1994 in chapter 6, "Fictional Protocols", of his Six Walks in the Fictional Woods and in his 2010 novel The Cemetery of Prague.

History

Publication history

The Protocols appeared in print in the Russian Empire as early as 1903, published as a series of articles in Znamya, a Black Hundreds newspaper owned by Pavel Krushevan. It appeared again in 1905 as the final chapter (Chapter XII) of the second edition of Velikoe v malom i antikhrist ("The Great in the Small & Antichrist"), a book by Sergei Nilus. In 1906, it appeared in pamphlet form edited by Georgy Butmi de Katzman.

These first three (and subsequently more) Russian language imprints were published and circulated in the Russian Empire during the 1903–06 period as a tool for scapegoating Jews, blamed by the monarchists for the defeat in the Russo-Japanese War and the Revolution of 1905. Common to all three texts is the idea that Jews aim for world domination. Since The Protocols are presented as merely a document, the front matter and back matter are needed to explain its alleged origin. The diverse imprints, however, are mutually inconsistent. The general claim is that the document was stolen from a secret Jewish organization. Since the alleged original stolen manuscript does not exist, one is forced to restore a purported original edition. This has been done by the Italian scholar, Cesare G. De Michelis in 1998, in a work which was translated into English and published in 2004, where he treats his subject as Apocrypha.

As the Russian Revolution unfolded, causing White movement-affiliated Russians to flee to the West, this text was carried along and assumed a new purpose. Until then, The Protocols had remained obscure; it now became an instrument for blaming Jews for the Russian Revolution. It became a tool, a political weapon, used against the Bolsheviks who were depicted as overwhelmingly Jewish, allegedly executing the "plan" embodied in The Protocols. The purpose was to discredit the October Revolution, prevent the West from recognizing the Soviet Union, and bring about the downfall of Vladimir Lenin's regime.

First Russian language editions

The chapter "In the Jewish Cemetery in Prague" from Goedsche's Biarritz, with its strong antisemitic theme containing the alleged rabbinical plot against the European civilization, was translated into Russian as a separate pamphlet in 1872. However, in 1921, Princess Catherine Radziwill gave a private lecture in New York in which she claimed that the Protocols were a forgery compiled in 1904–05 by Russian journalists Matvei Golovinski and Manasevich-Manuilov at the direction of Pyotr Rachkovsky, Chief of the Russian secret service in Paris.

In 1944, German writer Konrad Heiden identified Golovinski as an author of the Protocols. Radziwill's account was supported by Russian historian Mikhail Lepekhine, who published his findings in November 1999 in the French newsweekly L'Express. Lepekhine considers the Protocols a part of a scheme to persuade Tsar Nicholas II that the modernization of Russia was really a Jewish plot to control the world. Stephen Eric Bronner writes that groups opposed to progress, parliamentarianism, urbanization, and capitalism, and an active Jewish role in these modern institutions, were particularly drawn to the antisemitism of the document. Ukrainian scholar Vadim Skuratovsky offers extensive literary, historical and linguistic analysis of the original text of the Protocols and traces the influences of Fyodor Dostoyevsky's prose (in particular, The Grand Inquisitor and The Possessed) on Golovinski's writings, including the Protocols.

Golovinski's role in the writing of the Protocols is disputed by Michael Hagemeister, Richard Levy and Cesare De Michelis, who each write that the account which involves him is historically unverifiable and to a large extent provably wrong.

In his book The Non-Existent Manuscript, Italian scholar Cesare G. De Michelis studies early Russian publications of the Protocols. The Protocols were first mentioned in the Russian press in April 1902, by the Saint Petersburg newspaper Novoye Vremya ( – The New Times). The article was written by famous conservative publicist Mikhail Menshikov as a part of his regular series "Letters to Neighbors" ("Письма к ближним") and was titled "Plots against Humanity". The author described his meeting with a lady (Yuliana Glinka, as it is known now) who, after telling him about her mystical revelations, implored him to get familiar with the documents later known as the Protocols; but after reading some excerpts, Menshikov became quite skeptical about their origin and did not publish them.

Krushevan and Nilus editions
The Protocols were published at the earliest, in serialized form, from August 28 to September 7 (O.S.) 1903, in Znamya, a Saint Petersburg daily newspaper, under Pavel Krushevan. Krushevan had initiated the Kishinev pogrom four months earlier.

In 1905, Sergei Nilus published the full text of the Protocols in Chapter XII, the final chapter (pp. 305–417), of the second edition (or third, according to some sources) of his book, Velikoe v malom i antikhrist, which translates as "The Great within the Small: The Coming of the Anti-Christ and the Rule of Satan on Earth". He claimed it was the work of the First Zionist Congress, held in 1897 in Basel, Switzerland. When it was pointed out that the First Zionist Congress had been open to the public and was attended by many non-Jews, Nilus changed his story, saying the Protocols were the work of the 1902–03 meetings of the Elders, but contradicting his own prior statement that he had received his copy in 1901:

Stolypin's fraud investigation, 1905
A subsequent secret investigation ordered by Pyotr Stolypin, the newly appointed chairman of the Council of Ministers, came to the conclusion that the Protocols first appeared in Paris in antisemitic circles around 1897–98. When Nicholas II learned of the results of this investigation, he requested, "The Protocols should be confiscated, a good cause cannot be defended by dirty means." Despite the order, or because of the "good cause", numerous reprints proliferated. Nicholas later read the Protocols to his family during their imprisonment.

The Protocols in the West
In February 1920, Eyre & Spottiswoode published the first English translation of The Protocols of the Elders of Zion in Britain. According to a letter written by art historian Robert Hobart Cust, the pamphlet had been translated, prepared, and paid for by George Shanks and their mutual friend, Major Edward Griffiths George Burdon, who was serving as Secretary of the United Russia Societies Association at that time. In an edition of Lord Alfred Douglas’ Plain English journal dated January 1921, it is claimed that Shanks, a former officer in the Royal Navy Air Service and the Russian Government Committee in Kingsway, London, had found post-war employment in the Chief Whip's Office at 12 Downing Street, before being offered a position as Personal Secretary to Sir Philip Sassoon, at that time serving as Private Secretary to British Prime Minister David Lloyd George in Britain's Coalition Government.

In the United States, The Protocols are to be understood in the context of the First Red Scare (1917–20). The text was purportedly brought to the United States by a Russian Army officer in 1917; it was translated into English by Natalie de Bogory (personal assistant of Harris A. Houghton, an officer of the Department of War) in June 1918, and Russian expatriate Boris Brasol soon circulated it in American government circles, specifically diplomatic and military, in typescript form, a copy of which is archived by the Hoover Institute.

On October 27 and 28, 1919, the Philadelphia Public Ledger published excerpts of an English language translation as the "Red Bible," deleting all references to the purported Jewish authorship and re-casting the document as a Bolshevik manifesto. The author of the articles was the paper's correspondent at the time, Carl W. Ackerman, who later became the head of the journalism department at Columbia University.

In 1923, there appeared an anonymously edited pamphlet by the Britons Publishing Society, a successor to The Britons, an entity created and headed by Henry Hamilton Beamish. This imprint was allegedly a translation by Victor E. Marsden, who had died in October 1920.

On May 8, 1920, an article in The Times followed German translation and appealed for an inquiry into what it called an "uncanny note of prophecy". In the leader (editorial) titled "The Jewish Peril, a Disturbing Pamphlet: Call for Inquiry", Wickham Steed wrote about The Protocols:

Steed retracted his endorsement of The Protocols after they were exposed as a forgery.

United States

For nearly two years starting in 1920, the American industrialist Henry Ford published in a newspaper he owned — The Dearborn Independent — a series of antisemitic articles that quoted liberally from the Protocols. The actual author of the articles is generally believed to have been the newspaper's editor William Cameron. During 1922, the circulation of the Dearborn Independent grew to almost 270,000 paid copies. Ford later published a compilation of the articles in book form as "The International Jew: The World's Foremost Problem".  In 1921, Ford cited evidence of a Jewish threat: "The only statement I care to make about the Protocols is that they fit in with what is going on. They are 16 years old, and they have fitted the world situation up to this time." Robert A. Rosenbaum wrote that "In 1927, bowing to legal and economic pressure, Ford issued a retraction and apology—while disclaiming personal responsibility—for the anti-Semitic articles and closed the Dearborn Independent". He was also an admirer of Nazi Germany.

In 1934, an anonymous editor expanded the compilation with "Text and Commentary" (pp 136–41). The production of this uncredited compilation was a 300-page book, an inauthentic expanded edition of the twelfth chapter of Nilus's 1905 book on the coming of the anti-Christ. It consists of substantial liftings of excerpts of articles from Ford's antisemitic periodical The Dearborn Independent. This 1934 text circulates most widely in the English-speaking world, as well as on the internet. The "Text and Commentary" concludes with a comment on Chaim Weizmann's October 6, 1920, remark at a banquet: "A beneficent protection which God has instituted in the life of the Jew is that He has dispersed him all over the world". Marsden, who was dead by then, is credited with the following assertion:

The Times exposes a forgery, 1921

In 1920–1921, the history of the concepts found in the Protocols was traced back to the works of Goedsche and Jacques Crétineau-Joly by Lucien Wolf (an English Jewish journalist), and published in London in August 1921. But a dramatic exposé occurred in the series of articles in The Times by its Constantinople reporter, Philip Graves, who discovered the plagiarism from the work of Maurice Joly.

According to writer Peter Grose, Allen Dulles, who was in Constantinople developing relationships in post-Ottoman political structures, discovered "the source" of the documentation and ultimately provided him to The Times. Grose writes that The Times extended a loan to the source, a Russian émigré who refused to be identified, with the understanding the loan would not be repaid. Colin Holmes, a lecturer in economic history at Sheffield University, identified the émigré as Mikhail Raslovlev, a self-identified antisemite, who gave the information to Graves so as not to "give a weapon of any kind to the Jews, whose friend I have never been."

In the first article of Graves' series, titled "A Literary Forgery", the editors of The Times wrote, "our Constantinople Correspondent presents for the first time conclusive proof that the document is in the main a clumsy plagiarism. He has forwarded us a copy of the French book from which the plagiarism is made." In the same year, an entire book documenting the hoax was published in the United States by Herman Bernstein. Despite this widespread and extensive debunking, the Protocols continued to be regarded as important factual evidence by antisemites. Dulles, a successful lawyer and career diplomat, attempted to persuade the US State Department to publicly denounce the forgery, but without success.

Switzerland

The Berne Trial, 1934–35

The selling of the Protocols (edited by German antisemite Theodor Fritsch) by the National Front during a political meeting in the Casino of Berne on June 13, 1933, led to the Berne Trial in the Amtsgericht (district court) of Berne, the capital of Switzerland, on October 29, 1934. The plaintiffs (the Swiss Jewish Association and the Jewish Community of Berne) were represented by Hans Matti and Georges Brunschvig, helped by Emil Raas. Working on behalf of the defense was German antisemitic propagandist Ulrich Fleischhauer. On May 19, 1935, two defendants (Theodore Fischer and Silvio Schnell) were convicted of violating a Bernese statute prohibiting the distribution of "immoral, obscene or brutalizing" texts while three other defendants were acquitted. The court declared the Protocols to be forgeries, plagiarisms, and obscene literature. Judge Walter Meyer, a Christian who had not previously heard of the Protocols, said in conclusion,

Vladimir Burtsev, a Russian émigré, anti-Bolshevik and anti-Fascist who exposed numerous Okhrana agents provocateurs in the early 1900s, served as a witness at the Berne Trial. In 1938 in Paris he published a book, The Protocols of the Elders of Zion: A Proved Forgery, based on his testimony.

On November 1, 1937, the defendants appealed the verdict to the Obergericht (Cantonal Supreme Court) of Berne. A panel of three judges acquitted them, holding that the Protocols, while false, did not violate the statute at issue because they were "political publications" and not "immoral (obscene) publications (Schundliteratur)" in the strict sense of the law. The presiding judge's opinion stated, though, that the forgery of the Protocols was not questionable and expressed regret that the law did not provide adequate protection for Jews from this sort of literature. The court refused to impose the fees of defense of the acquitted defendants to the plaintiffs, and the acquitted Theodor Fischer had to pay 100 Fr. to the total state costs of the trial (Fr. 28,000) that were eventually paid by the Canton of Berne. This decision gave grounds for later allegations that the appeal court "confirmed authenticity of the Protocols" which is contrary to the facts.

Evidence presented at the trial, which strongly influenced later accounts up to the present, was that the Protocols were originally written in French by agents of the Tzarist secret police (the Okhrana). However, this version has been questioned by several modern scholars. Michael Hagemeister discovered that the primary witness Alexandre du Chayla had previously written in support of the blood libel, had received four thousand Swiss francs for his testimony, and was secretly doubted even by the plaintiffs. Charles Ruud and Sergei Stepanov concluded that there is no substantial evidence of Okhrana involvement and strong circumstantial evidence against it.

The Basel Trial
A similar trial in Switzerland took place at Basel. The Swiss Frontists Alfred Zander and Eduard Rüegsegger distributed the Protocols (edited by the German Gottfried zur Beek) in Switzerland. Jules Dreyfus-Brodsky and Marcus Cohen sued them for insult to Jewish honor. At the same time, chief rabbi Marcus Ehrenpreis of Stockholm (who also witnessed at the Berne Trial) sued Alfred Zander who contended that Ehrenpreis himself had said that the Protocols were authentic (referring to the foreword of the edition of the Protocols by the German antisemite Theodor Fritsch). On June 5, 1936, these proceedings ended with a settlement.

Germany
According to historian Norman Cohn, the assassins of German Jewish politician Walther Rathenau (1867–1922) were convinced that Rathenau was a literal "Elder of Zion".

It seems likely Adolf Hitler first became aware of the Protocols after hearing about it from ethnic German white émigrés, such as Alfred Rosenberg and Max Erwin von Scheubner-Richter. Rosenberg and Scheubner-Richter were also members of the early Aufbau Vereinigung counterrevolutionary group, which according to historian Michael Kellogg, influenced the Nazis in promulgating a Protocols-like myth.

Hitler refers to the Protocols in Mein Kampf:

The Protocols also became a part of the Nazi propaganda effort to justify persecution of the Jews. In The Holocaust: The Destruction of European Jewry 1933–1945, Nora Levin states that "Hitler used the Protocols as a manual in his war to exterminate the Jews":

Hitler did not mention the Protocols in his speeches after his defense of it in Mein Kampf. "Distillations of the text appeared in German classrooms, indoctrinated the Hitler Youth, and invaded the USSR along with German soldiers." Nazi Propaganda Minister Joseph Goebbels proclaimed: "The Zionist Protocols are as up-to-date today as they were the day they were first published."

Richard S. Levy criticizes the claim that the Protocols had a large effect on Hitler's thinking, writing that it is based mostly on suspect testimony and lacks hard evidence. Randall Bytwerk agrees, writing that most leading Nazis did not believe it was genuine despite having an "inner truth" suitable for propaganda.

Publication of the Protocols was stopped in Germany in 1939 for unknown reasons. An edition that was ready for printing was blocked by censorship laws.

German-language publications
Having fled Ukraine in 1918–19, Piotr Shabelsky-Bork brought the Protocols to Ludwig Müller von Hausen who then published them in German. Under the pseudonym Gottfried zur Beek he produced the first and "by far the most important" German translation. It appeared in January 1920 as a part of a larger antisemitic tract dated 1919. After The Times discussed the book respectfully in May 1920 it became a bestseller. "The Hohenzollern family helped defray the publication costs, and Kaiser Wilhelm II had portions of the book read out aloud to dinner guests". Alfred Rosenberg's 1923 edition "gave a forgery a huge boost".

Italy
Fascist politician Giovanni Preziosi published the first Italian edition of the Protocols in 1921. The book however had little impact until the mid-1930s. A new 1937 edition had a much higher impact, and three further editions in the following months sold 60,000 copies total. The fifth edition had an introduction by Julius Evola, which argued around the issue of forgery, stating: "The problem of the authenticity of this document is secondary and has to be replaced by the much more serious and essential problem of its truthfulness".

Post World War II

Middle East 
Neither governments nor political leaders in most parts of the world have referred to the Protocols since World War II. The exception to this is the Middle East, where a large number of Arab and Muslim regimes and leaders have endorsed them as authentic, including endorsements from Presidents Gamal Abdel Nasser and Anwar Sadat of Egypt, President Abdul Salam Arif of Iraq, King Faisal of Saudi Arabia, and Colonel Muammar al-Gaddafi of Libya. A translation made by an Arab Christian appeared in Cairo in 1927 or 1928, this time as a book. The first translation by an Arab Muslim was also published in Cairo, but only in 1951.

The 1988 charter of Hamas, a Palestinian Islamist group, stated that the Protocols embodies the plan of the Zionists. The reference was removed in the new covenant issued in 2017. Recent endorsements in the 21st century have been made by the Grand Mufti of Jerusalem, Sheikh Ekrima Sa'id Sabri, the education ministry of Saudi Arabia, and a member of the Greek Parliament, Ilias Kasidiaris. The Palestinian Solidarity Committee of South Africa distributed copies of the Protocols at the World Conference against Racism 2001. The book was sold during the conference in the exhibition tent set up for the distribution of the antiracist literature.

However, figures within the region have publicly asserted that The Protocols of the Elders of Zion is a forgery such as former Grand Mufti of Egypt Ali Gomaa, who made an official court complaint concerning a publisher who falsely put his name on an introduction to its Arabic translation.

Contemporary conspiracy theories 

The Protocols continue to be widely available around the world, particularly on the Internet.

The Protocols is widely considered influential in the development of other conspiracy theories, and reappears repeatedly in contemporary conspiracy literature. Notions derived from the Protocols include claims that the "Jews" depicted in the Protocols are a cover for the Illuminati, Freemasons, the Priory of Sion or, in the opinion of David Icke, "extra-dimensional entities". In his book And the truth shall set you free (1995), Icke asserted that the Protocols are genuine and accurate.

Adaptations

Print
Masami Uno's book If You Understand Judea You Can Comprehend the World: 1990 Scenario for the 'Final Economic War''' became popular in Japan around 1987 and was based upon the Protocols.

Television
In 2001–2002, Arab Radio and Television produced a 30-part television miniseries entitled Horseman Without a Horse, starring prominent Egyptian actor Mohamed Sobhi, which contains dramatizations of the Protocols. The United States and Israel criticized Egypt for airing the program. Ash-Shatat (Arabic: الشتات The Diaspora) is a 29-part Syrian television series produced in 2003 by a private Syrian film company and was based in part on the Protocols. Syrian national television declined to air the program. Ash-Shatat was shown on Lebanon's Al-Manar, before being dropped. The series was shown in Iran in 2004, and in Jordan during October 2005 on Al-Mamnou, a Jordanian satellite network.

See also

Pertinent concepts
 Black propaganda
 Blood libel
 Cultural Marxism conspiracy theory
 Disinformation
 Hate speech
 Jewish Bolshevism
 Shadow government (conspiracy)
 World government

Individuals
 Martin Heidegger and Nazism

Related or similar texts
 Alta Vendita Hamas Covenant
 Memoirs of Mr. Hempher, The British Spy to the Middle East The Prague Cemetery Protocols of Zion (film)
 A Racial Program for the Twentieth Century Tanaka Memorial
 Warrant for GenocideNotes

References
Citations

Works cited

 
 
 
 
 
 
 
 
 
 
 
 
 
 
 
 .
 
 
 
 
 
 
 

Further reading
Books and journal articles
 Ben-Itto, Hadassa: The Lie That Wouldn't Die: The Protocols of the Elders of Zion  (pub. Vallentine Mitchell & Co Ltd)
 
 
 
 
 
 
 
 Sykes, Christopher. "The Protocols of the Elders of Zion" History Today'' (Feb 1967), Vol. 17 Issue 2, p81-88 online

External links

 Protocols of the Elders of Zion: Key Dates – The Holocaust Encyclopedia (United States Holocaust Memorial Museum)
 The Protocols of the Learned Elders of Zion translated by Victor E. Marsden at archive.org
 The Protocols of the Elders of Zion (Original Russian Edition) at archive.org
 , 4pp. A disclaimer published as a result of a conference held in New York City on November 30, 1920.
 .
 .
 .
 .
 .
 
 .
 .
 .
 .
 

Protocols of the Elders of Zion
1903 documents
1905 books
1920 books
1900s hoaxes
Antisemitic forgeries
Antisemitic publications
Conspiracist media
Document forgeries
Jews and Judaism in the Russian Empire
Antisemitism in the Russian Empire
Literary forgeries
Religious hoaxes
Political forgery
Works of unknown authorship
Books involved in plagiarism controversies
Antisemitism in the United States
Censored books
Hoaxes in Russia